As a surname, Dick is the 1,513th most common name in Great Britain with 6,545 bearers. Although found in every part of Britain, the form Dick is especially common in Scotland, and it was from there, in the 17th century, that the surname was taken to Northern Ireland. It is most common in West Lothian, where it is the 78th most common surname with 1,742 bearers. Other notable concentrations include Northumberland (146th, 1,630, Tyne and Wear (335th, 1,738) and Berkshire (365th, 1,704) and in Norfolk.

Currently, in the U.S., it ranks at 1,388 out of 88,799 surnames.

References

Surnames
English-language surnames
Surnames from given names
Russian Mennonite surnames